Selinopsis is a genus of flowering plants belonging to the family Apiaceae.

Its native range is Northwestern Africa.

Species:

Selinopsis foetida 
Selinopsis montana

References

Apioideae
Apioideae genera